Grzegorz Kowalski may refer to:

 Grzegorz Kowalski (artist) (born 1942), Polish sculptor, designer of interior decoration
Grzegorz Kowalski (footballer, born 1963)
Grzegorz Kowalski (footballer, born 1977)